Edward B. Miller (born August 22, 1971, Baltimore, Maryland), served as Deputy Chief of Staff to former Republican Governor Robert Ehrlich.

Biography 
Miller received a B.A. in history from the University of Pennsylvania in 1993, and a J.D. from the University of Virginia School of Law in 2000.  He worked as a political pollster in Washington, D.C., and then became an attorney with the Baltimore firm Piper Rudnik LLP.

Miller joined the Maryland state government as Chief of Staff in the Department of Business and Economic Development in August 2003, remaining in that position until November.  He became Deputy Secretary of the department in November 2003, remaining in that position until January 2004.

Miller became Ehrlich's Deputy Chief of Staff on January 16, 2004, one of three reporting to Governor Ehrlich.  He was responsible for oversight of departments of Agriculture; Business and Economic Development; Environment; General Services; Housing and Community Development; Labor, Licensing, and Regulation; Natural Resources; Planning; and Transportation; the Office of Minority Affairs; State Department of Assessments and Taxation; Maryland Automobile Insurance Fund; Maryland Economic Development Corporation; Maryland Energy Administration; Maryland Environmental Service; Maryland Insurance Administration; State Lottery Agency; and Maryland Stadium Authority.

External links 
Official biography

American political consultants
Lawyers from Baltimore
1971 births
Living people
Maryland Republicans